The Houston Lonestars is a United States Australian Football League team, based in Houston, United States. It was founded in 2010. They play in the USAFL.

See also

References

External links
 

Australian rules football clubs in the United States
Sports in Houston
Australian rules football clubs established in 2005
2005 establishments in Texas
Sports teams in Houston